Aaron Flint Jamison (born 1979) is an American conceptual artist and associate professor in the University of Washington School of Art + Art History + Design. He works with various media including sculpture, publication, video, and performance.

Life and work
Jamison was born in Billings, Montana. He received a B.A. from Trinity Western University, Vancouver, British Columbia, in 2002 and an M.F.A. from San Francisco Art Institute in 2006.

He co-founded the artist-run center Department of Safety (2002–2010) in Anacortes, Washington, and he was a co-founder of the art center Yale Union (YU) in Portland, Oregon. "Yale Union (YU) operated as a non-profit exhibition, production, and community space since 2010 through 2020, when it completed the transfer of ownership of the land and building to the Native Arts and Cultures Foundation (NACF)." "The transfer of the Yale Union to NACF to support the cultural continuance of Indigenous communities is unprecedented, a first,” said Joy Harjo, Mvskoke poet and former poet laureate of the United States. 

Jamison is the founder and editor-in-chief of Veneer Magazine, a subscription-based art publication. Veneer is an 18-issue publication, the issues of which are, "lavishly produced, combining different paper stocks, and analogue and digital print techniques."

Jamison's work is held in the permanent collection of the Whitney Museum of American Art.

Exhibitions

Solo exhibitions
 Artists Space, New York (2013) 
 Miguel Abreu Gallery, New York (2015) 
 Air de Paris, Paris (2015)
 Miguel Abreu Gallery, New York (2017)
 Galerie Max Mayer, Düsseldorf (2017)
 Miguel Abreu Gallery, New York (2019)
 Opportunity Zones, Kunst Halle Sankt Gallen, (2019)

Group exhibitions
 Frozen Lakes, Artists Space (2013)
 Sequence 5, Miguel Abreu Gallery, New York (2014)
 Liverpool Biennial, Liverpool (2014)
 Collected by Thea Westreich Wagner and Ethan Wagner, Whitney Museum of American Art (2015–2016)
 Incorporated! Ateliers de Rennes - Biennale d'art Contemporain (2016)
 Whitney Biennial (2017)
 Mechanisms, CCA Wattis, San Francisco (2017)
 Signal or Noise | The Photographic II, S.M.A.K., Ghent (2018–2019)

References

External links
 Air de Paris
 Yale Union
 Veneer Magazine
 Taylor, Phil. "Aaron Flint Jamison," Artforum, September 2015.
 Sladen, Mark. "Mark Sladen on information flow in the work of Aaron Flint Jamison," ArtReview, September 2014.
 Fiske, Courtney. "Aaron Flint Jamison," Art in America, January 2014.
 O'neil-Butler, Lauren. “Aaron Flint Jamison: 500 Words,” Artforum.com, November 2010.
 Watts, Jonathan P. “In Focus: Aaron Flint Jamison,” Frieze, Issue 156, August 2013.

Living people
1979 births
American conceptual artists
San Francisco Art Institute alumni
Artists from Portland, Oregon
People from Billings, Montana
Trinity Western University alumni